Agonia is a 1969 Greek drama film directed by Odysseas Kosteletos.

Cast
Tolis Voskopoulos as Alexis Karnezis
Eleni Anousaki as Anna Antoniou
Despoina Nikolaidou as Kaiti Andreou
Lavrentis Dianellos as Petros Karnezis
Thodoros Exarhos as Christidis
Nassos Kedrakas as Kaiti's friend
Vilma Kyrou as Christina
Giorgos Nezos as Maratos
Dimitris Koukis as Renos
Elpida Braoudaki as Mary

External links
 

1969 films
Greek romantic drama films
1960s Greek-language films
1969 romantic drama films